The Cathedral is a  mountain summit located in Summit County, Utah, United States.

Description
The Cathedral is set within the High Uintas Wilderness on land managed by Uinta-Wasatch-Cache National Forest. It is situated in the Uinta Mountains which are a subset of the Rocky Mountains, and it ranks as the 87th-highest summit in Utah. Topographic relief is significant as the summit rises  in one mile. Neighbors include Ostler Peak 3.7 miles to the southwest, Mount Beulah two miles northeast, Yard Peak 1.6 mile to the south, and Dead Horse Peak is 2.4 miles to the south-southeast. Precipitation runoff from this mountain drains north to the East Fork Bear River. This mountain's toponym has been officially adopted by the United States Board on Geographic Names.

Climate
Based on the Köppen climate classification, The Cathedral is located in a subarctic climate zone with cold snowy winters and mild summers. Tundra climate characterizes the summit and highest slopes.

See also
 Geology of the Uinta Mountains

References

External links
 The Cathedral: weather forecast

Mountains of Utah
Features of the Uinta Mountains
Mountains of Summit County, Utah
North American 3000 m summits
Wasatch-Cache National Forest